Parminder Ghumman is an Indian voice actor who specializes for performing voices for local Indian productions and also dubs for foreign productions into the Hindi language, English, Punjabi, Urdu and Oriya.

He is a member of AVAIndia, which is an association group for Indian voice artists.

Filmography

Animated films

Dubbing career
Parminder has been known for dubbing for Middle-age male characters, as well as relaxed and loud characters.

Dubbing roles

Animated series

Live action films

Hollywood films

South Indian films

Animated films

See also
Dubbing (filmmaking)
List of Indian dubbing artists

References

Year of birth missing (living people)
Male actors from Punjab, India
Indian male voice actors
Living people